Not in Front of the Children is a BBC Television sitcom, which ran for four series from 1967 to 1970.

It starred Wendy Craig as Jennifer Corner, a rather scatterbrained middle-class housewife. Her husband Henry was a school art teacher, played by Paul Daneman in the Comedy Playhouse pilot "House in a Tree" and the first series, and Ronald Hines subsequently. They had three children, a boy in his early teens (played by Hugo Keith-Johnston) and two girls who were slightly younger (played by Roberta Tovey and Jill Riddick). Charlotte Mitchell played her friend Mary.

In later series, she had a baby, and they moved from the London suburb of Battersea to the country.

It is significant mainly as Wendy Craig's first role as a scatty housewife; she played similar roles in several other series over the next 15 years.

Surviving episodes
Series 1
Episode 3: "The Word" (8 September 1967)
Series 2
Episode 2: "Religious Revival" (1 March 1968)
Episode 5: "The Iron Hand" (22 March 1968)
Episode 6: "The George Washington Complex" (29 March 1968)
Episode 7: "Home Chat" (5 April 1968)
Episode 8: "Change of Policy" (12 April 1968)
Series 4
Episode 4: "A Babe Around The House" (3 October 1969)
Episode 13: "Pastures New" (5 December 1969)

Radio adaptation
A radio adaptation of the programme was broadcast on BBC Radio 2 in 1969 and 1970, with Wendy Craig and Francis Matthews in the leading roles. Charlotte Mitchell was Mary, Roberta Tovey was Trudi and Hugo Keith-Johnston played Robin. The scripts were adapted from the TV scripts by Richard Waring. Since 2015 both series have been broadcast on BBC Radio 4 Extra.

DVD release
The eight surviving episodes were released on DVD for the first time on Monday, 8 September 2014.

References

External links

1967 British television series debuts
1970 British television series endings
BBC television sitcoms
Comedy Playhouse
Lost BBC episodes
1960s British sitcoms
1970s British sitcoms
Television series by BBC Studios